The 1884 Anglo-Queensland Football Association season refers to the soccer competitions contested under the organisation of the Anglo-Queensland Football Association in 1884. Across the one senior cup, this was the first season of organised soccer in Queensland.

Cup competitions

1884 Anglo-Queensland FA Cup

The 1884 Anglo Queensland FA Cup was the first edition of the first soccer tournament in Australia, the Anglo Queensland FA Cup. The winners of the cup were the Rangers who defeated St Andrews 1–0 in the Final.

Teams
The Anglo Queensland FA Cup was a competition with three teams taking part in a round-robin tournament with the top two teams qualifying for the Final.

Regular season
The regular season was played in a round-robin tournament of three teams with two qualifying for the Final. The two teams who advanced to the Final were St Andrews and Rangers.

Final

References

1884 in Australian soccer